Hugo Preuß (Preuss) (28 October 1860 – 9 October 1925) was a German lawyer and liberal politician. He was the author of the draft version of the constitution that was passed by the Weimar National Assembly and came into force in August 1919.  He based it on three principles: all political authority belongs
to the people; that the state should be organized on a federal basis; and that the Reich should form a democratic Rechtsstaat (state based in law) within the international community.

Early life and academic career
Hugo Preuß  was born in Berlin on 28 October 1860 as the only child of Levin Preuß (1820 or 1821-62), a Jewish owner of a lithographic business, and his wife Minna (née Israel, 1826–99). Hugo's father died in 1862 and in 1863 his mother married her husband's brother, Leopold Preuß (1827–1905), a well-off grain merchant. After growing up in the western part of Berlin Hugo Preuß attended university from 1878 at Berlin and Heidelberg, studying Rechts- und Staatswissenschaften (law and governance) but with additional courses on history and philosophy. In May 1883, he passed the 1. Staatsexamen and in November was awarded the Dr. iur. at Göttingen. He stopped working as a legal Referendar in 1886 and instead chose a career as an academic teacher. In 1889, he was habilitated with his publication Gemeinde, Staat, Reich als Gebietskörperschaften and began working as a Privatdozent (lecturer) at the university in Berlin.  Although the quality of his writings was appreciated by academia, his Jewish religion and democratic-liberal views prevented him from becoming a tenured professor at the conservative Berlin university.

In 1889, Preuß also married Else Liebermann, daughter of Carl Liebermann in Berlin. She was also related to Max Liebermann, the artist, and to Felix Liebermann. Hugo and Else had four sons, one of whom died early. The others were Ernst (*1891), Kurt (*1893) and Jean (Hans, *1901).

In 1895, he became a member of the municipal parliament in Charlottenburg, Berlin. Only in 1906 did Preuß become a full professor, at the Berliner Handelshochschule newly founded by local merchants. He taught there until 1918, when he also was Rektor. His main focus was on constitutional law and on autonomous municipal administration (kommunale Selbstverwaltung). In 1906, the first volume of Die Entwicklung des deutschen Städtewesens was published. From 1910-18 he was honorary city councillor for the FVP. In this capacity he contributed to the project that what would later become the Greater Berlin Act. In 1912, he unsuccessfully ran for a seat in the Reichstag. In his widely read publication Das deutsche Volk und die Politik of 1915 he forcefully argued for a transformation of the Obrigkeitsstaat into a Volksstaat.

Revolution, political career and Weimar Constitution
Only a few days after the abdication of Emperor Wilhelm II had been announced during the German Revolution of 1918–19, Preuß, in an article published on 14 November 1918, called on the middle-classes to "accept facts" and cooperate in creating the republic. On 15 November, the head of the revolutionary government, Friedrich Ebert of the Social Democratic Party of Germany (SPD) appointed Preuß as Staatssekretär des Innern. At the time, the revolutionary Council of the People's Deputies (Rat der Volksbeauftragten) co-existed with the old Imperial bureaucracy. Although the Council served as the cabinet and took the important decisions, it lacked an administrative apparatus and thus made use of the existing structures. Under the old Imperial constitution, the Staatssekretäre had been the heads of the various Ämter, not true ministers but more senior civil servants working for the Reichskanzler (chancellor). Preuß' role thus could be described as head of the "Ministry of the Interior". The Council of the People's Deputies tasked him with preparing a draft for a new republican constitution. In November, Preuß also was a founding member of the new DDP.

On 13 February 1919, Preuß became Reichsinnenminister (Interior Minister) in the first elected government of the republic under Ministerpräsident Philipp Scheidemann (SPD). Preuß opposed vehemently the Triple Entente prohibition of the incorporation of German Austria into Germany as a contradiction of the Wilsonian principle of self-determination of peoples. The government resigned on 20 June 1919 in protest against the Treaty of Versailles. It was followed by the government of Gustav Bauer (SPD), who appointed Preuß Reichskommissar für Verfassungsfragen (commissioner for constitutional issues). On 14 August 1919, the Weimar Constitution came into force.

The final version of the constitution naturally was different from his original draft in various ways. Preuß' ideas were notably rejected concerning the reorganisation of the individual territories of the Reich—blocked by the new governments of the States. He also was unable to put into practice his idea of a very narrow definition of fundamental rights, limited to the classical freedoms, which he wanted to codify in just three articles of the constitution. Moreover, his attempt to change the nature of the second parliamentary chamber (made up of delegates from the individual State governments) proved impossible. However, some parts of the Weimar Constitution (on the role of parliament, government and Reichspräsident), considered especially problematic in hindsight, were strongly shaped by his ideas. In particular, the powerful position of the head of state, the Reichspräsident, who was given authority to dissolve the Reichstag with no effective limitations and who had considerable emergency powers under Article 48, did not appear to Preuß as a contradiction to the idea of a democratic state. He felt this was a necessary precaution to deal with the danger of a dictatorship of the parliamentary majority and to resolve conflicts between government and parliament by the most democratic method available—through new elections. Preuß also was  pessimistic about the ability of the political parties to operate successfully within the new framework: they had no experience in taking on responsibility or with the sort of compromise required for stable government. Under the Empire the governments had operated mostly independently of the parties and the Reichstag majority of the day.

Later life

From 1919 to 1925 Preuß was a member first of the Verfassunggebende Preußische Landesversammlung (1919/20), the equivalent of the National Assembly for the Freistaat Preußen, and then the Preußischer Landtag. He published numerous works on legal and constitutional issues as well as pro-republican writings. He was also active in the Reichsbanner Schwarz-Rot-Gold. Hugo Preuß died in Berlin on 9 October 1925. He is buried at the Urnenfriedhof Gerchtsstraße Berlin-Wedding. Since 1952 the grave has been an Ehrengrab (honour grave) of what is now the State of Berlin.

The Jewish background of the main author of its constitution was one reason why the Weimar Republic was referred to as Judenrepublik ("Jews' Republic") by its detractors on the right.

Works
 Franz Lieber, ein Bürger zweier Welten. Habel, Berlin 1886 (Digital version)
 Gemeinde, Staat, Reich, 1889
 Das städtische Amtsrecht in Preußen, 1902
 Die Entwicklung des deutschen Städtewesens. Vol. 1: Entwicklungsgeschichte der deutschen Städteverfassung, 1906
 Stadt und Staat, 1909
 Zur preussischen Verwaltungsreform, 1910
 Das deutsche Volk und die Politik, 1915
 Deutschlands republikanische Reichsverfassung, 1921
 Vom Obrigkeitsstaat zum Volksstaat, 1921
 Um die Weimarer Reichsverfassung, 1924
 Staat, Recht und Freiheit. Aus vierzig Jahren deutscher Politik und Geschichte, 1926 (Collected works, collected by Theodor Heuss)
 Verfassungspolitische Entwicklungen in Deutschland und Westeuropa, ed. by Hedwig Hintze, Berlin 1927
 Reich und Länder. Bruchstücke eines Kommentars zur Verfassung des Deutschen Reiches, ed. by Gerhard Anschütz, Berlin 1928
 Gesammelte Schriften. Im Auftrag der Hugo-Preuß-Gesellschaft e.V. 5 Volumes (4 published so far), ed. by Detlef Lehnert, Tübingen 2007-, Vol. 1: Politik und Gesellschaft im Kaiserreich, 2007; Vol. 2: Öffentliches Recht und Rechtsphilosophie im Kaiserreich, 2009; Vol. 3: Verfassungsentwürfe, Verfassungskommentare, Verfassungtheorie [not yet published]; Vol. 4: Politik und Verfassung in der Weimarer Republik, 2008; Vol. 5: Kommunalwissenschaft und Kommunalpolitik, 2012.

See also
Carlo Schmid (German politician)

References

Further reading
 Schmitt, Carl, and Ellen Kennedy. The crisis of parliamentary democracy (MIT Press, 1988)
 Stirk, Peter. "Hugo Preuss, German political thought and the Weimar constitution." History of Political Thought (2002) 23#3 pp: 497-516.

External links

 Hugo-Preuß-Stiftung
 Hugo-Preuß-Gesellschaft e.V.
 

1860 births
1925 deaths
Politicians from Berlin
People from the Province of Brandenburg
19th-century German Jews
Free-minded Union politicians
Progressive People's Party (Germany) politicians
German Democratic Party politicians
Interior ministers of Germany
Reichsbanner Schwarz-Rot-Gold members
Political party founders